Pukiv is a village in Ivano-Frankivsk Raion, of Ivano-Frankivsk Oblast (province), Ukraine. It belongs to Rohatyn urban hromada, one of the hromadas of Ukraine. 

Until 18 July 2020, Pukiv belonged to Rohatyn Raion. The raion was abolished in July 2020 as part of the administrative reform of Ukraine, which reduced the number of raions of Ivano-Frankivsk Oblast to six. The area of Rohatyn Raion was merged into Ivano-Frankivsk Raion.

Famous people associated with the region:

Fedir Danylak — Ukrainian choreographer

References

Villages in Ivano-Frankivsk Raion